The silver-eared laughingthrush (Trochalopteron melanostigma) is a species of bird in the family Leiothrichidae. It is found in southern Yunnan, Laos, Myanmar, Thailand and Vietnam.  It was formerly considered a subspecies of the chestnut-crowned laughingthrush, G. erythrocephalus.

References

silver-eared laughingthrush
Birds of Laos
Birds of Myanmar
Birds of Thailand
Birds of Vietnam
Birds of Yunnan
silver-eared laughingthrush
silver-eared laughingthrush